Prasophyllum correctum, commonly known as the gaping leek orchid or Bairnsdale leek orchid, is a species of orchid species endemic to a small region in Victoria. It has a single dark green, tube-shaped leaf and up to twenty strongly scented, yellowish-green flowers and is only known from railway reserves near Bairnsdale.

Description
As with other leek orchids, the flowers are inverted so that the labellum is above the column rather than below it. The edges of the labellum are usually not crinkled or wavy but there is a fleshy, green, grooved callus in its centre. Flowering occurs in October and November.

Taxonomy and naming
Prasophyllum correctum was first formally described in 1994 by David Jones from a specimen collected near Stratford and the description was published in the journal Novon.

When David Jones described an apparently new species of Prasophyllum collected in 1991 near Bairnsdale, he gave it the name P. chasmogamum. It was later found that the orchid described was in fact Prasophyllum pyriforme and another specimen of a new species collected at the same site had been overlooked. The overlooked specimen was given the specific epithet (correctum) in recognition of the earlier mistake.

Distribution and habitat
The gaping leek orchid leek orchid grows in grassland and woodland in two locations between Stratford and Bairnsdale.

Conservation
Prasophyllum correctum is only known from two locations with a total population of fewer than 150 plants. It is classified as Threatened under the Victorian Flora and Fauna Guarantee Act 1988 and as Endangered under the Commonwealth Government Environment Protection and Biodiversity Conservation Act 1999 (EPBC) Act. The main threats to the species are competition from other plants including introduced species, grazing by rabbits and inappropriate fire regimes.

References

correctum
Flora of Victoria (Australia)
Endemic orchids of Australia
Plants described in 1994